5 is a brand of sugar-free chewing gum that is manufactured by the Wrigley Company, marketed toward teenagers. The name "5" hints at the five human senses (with the ad slogan "Stimulate Your Senses" and "How It Feels To Chew Five Gum") and that it has 5 calories. 

5 gum was introduced to United States markets in March 2007, in Canada in January 2008, in Russia, Europe and Australia in 2009, in China, India, Italy, Middle East, Thailand, and Malaysia in 2010. When introduced to new markets, 5 Gum would be stylized and branded as "New 5 Gum".

Products

The brand features 24 flavors of chewing gum, all of which are available in the United States with the exception of Cirrus, Zephyr and Evolution. The first three flavors introduced were Peppermint, Spearmint, and Cinnamon; second came Tropical and Berry; and in 2009, Winter mint and Bubble. In March 2010, two new flavors, both named "React" were introduced in the United States along with the slogan: "Everyone Experiences It Differently." "React" comes in both mint and fruit flavors. It was released in Australia in March 2011. 5 also offers a watermelon flavor called "Prism", a Green apple flavor called "Vortex" and a sour tropical flavor called "Swerve".

In Australia, "Pulse" and "React2" were introduced in 2009 and 2011 respectively. A limited edition flavor called "Mutant" was released in Australia as a promotion for X-Men: First Class in May 2011. It was discontinued and later re-released as Cirrus.
 In 2014 a flavor called "Strawberry" was released in Australia. A flavor called "Evolution" with a sour to sweet citrus pear taste was introduced in Germany and Italy at first and then available to a few other European countries such as Greece and Cyprus. Also, in June 2012, Wrigley released Cobalt and Rain micro-packs, bottle and mini bottle formats. The bottles contain pellet style gum instead of stick gum in the standard packs. The bottle format is available in Canada as well. Since 2013 there's also a small pouch which contains 15 pellets. It is available in both Focus-flavours. In 2015, a new fruit punch flavour called Tempo was introduced. Flood was introduced in 2015 to US and Canada. It is not to be confused with the Berry version in Europe.

On September 8th, 2020, 5 Gum announced that it would be collaborating with Razer's gaming beverage brand "Respawn By Razer" to Bring 3 new flavors of 5 Gum targeted towards gamers, claiming to enhance focus while gaming. The 3 flavors that were introduced were Cool Mint, Pomegranate Watermelon, and Tropical Pineapple. The gum is colored black.

Flavor Descriptions (United States)

Flavors that are available 

 Ascent ... an escalating Wintermint
 Cobalt ...a cooling peppermint
 Rain ...a tingling spearmint
 RPM ...a relaxing mint flavor
 React2 ...a unique mint flavor experience
 Flood ... a wave of strawberry experience
 Prism ... an appealing slice of watermelon flavor
 Maze ... a soothing sweet mint
 Cool Mint (Respawn)
 Pomegranate Watermelon (Respawn)
 Tropical Punch (Respawn)

Flavors no longer available 
 Atomic ...a strong mint & cinnamon
 Blueberry … a wave of a blueberry rush
 Glare ...a mystery of dark fruits
 Focus ...an eye-opening spearmint
 Beta ...a hyper sensorial berry
 Photon ... a radiant pineapple blend
 Lush/Pulse (rereleased as Swerve in July 2012)...a tangy to sweet tropical
 Turbulence ...a mouth-shaking watermelon
 Cirrus ...a bursting blueberry
 Evolution ...a sour to sweet citrus pear
 Elixir ...a mouthwatering berry
 Tempo ... a rhythmic fruit punch
 Focus ...an eye-opening peppermint
 Vortex ...a whirlwind of green apple
 Black Edition ...a dark mystery of fruits
 Ultramarine ...a current of cool mint
 Electro2 ...a tingling spearmint
 Zephyr ...a blast of strawberry
 Tempest ...a mouthwatering watermelon
 Solstice ...a warm to cool winter
 Zing/Evolve ...a sour to sweet bubble
 Flare ...a warming cinnamon
 React2 ...a unique fruit flavor experience

Nutrition
There are five calories in a piece of 5 gum. The gum contains aspartame (with phenylalanine), acesulfame-potassium, soy lecithin, sorbitol, mannitol and other sweeteners.

Packaging
A package of 5 gum contains 15 sticks of gum in the United States and Canada, and 12 in Europe and Australia. It is a slim packet with three rows of five in North America, or three rows of four in other countries. Ingredients, nutrition facts, and description of the flavor were once not on the outside of the box in the US, instead printed on the outer plastic wrap, to keep the box itself simple. However, the box itself now includes the nutrition facts when not purchased in a larger pack. The flavor description is now printed on the outside of the box. 

Many 5 gums now include various advertisements on the box, namely ones for Marvel Avengers movies. The foil that the gum is wrapped in is glossy and covered with subtle embossed 5 logos. The wrappers all match the color of the gum inside (except for the American Prism flavor, which has a lime green wrapper with red-orange gum). The original 5 gum variety pack contained three packs of Rain, Cobalt, Lush and Elixir. A new variety pack was introduced in fall 2009 containing the flavors Rain, Cobalt, Solstice and Zing, and another with three packs of Cobalt, Rain, Solstice, and Elixir. The pack has a Tidy Man logo, which is a human figure in the shape of the 5 logo.

In Serbia and Montenegro, 5 gum is sold in packets of 5 sticks. These packs are the same size as 10-packs of Orbit and Airwaves gum.

References

External links
 
 Wrigley.com - 5 Gum
 5 Gum Nutritional Facts

Chewing gum
Wrigley Company brands
Products introduced in 2007